Cha Soo-yeon (born August 15, 1981) is a South Korean actress. She is best known for her leading role in the 2008 film Beautiful.

Filmography

Film
On the Way (2014)
The Scent (2012)
Helpless (2012)
Love Call (2011)
Cafe Noir (2010)
After the Banquet (2009, telecinema)
The Executioner (2009)
Yoga (2009)
Five Senses of Eros "I'm Right Here" (2009)
Boat (2009)
Nowhere to Turn (2008)
Beautiful (2008)
For Eternal Hearts (2007)

Television series
Love Scene Number (MBC TV, 2021)
Private Lives (JTBC, 2020)
Good Casting (SBS, 2020)
Twelve Nights (Channel A, 2018)
"Fates & Furies" (SBS, 2018)
Ms. Hammurabi (JTBC, 2018)
My Heart Twinkle Twinkle (SBS, 2015)
Liar Game (tvN, 2014)
My Lover, Madame Butterfly (SBS, 2012)
Drama Special "Re-Memory" (KBS2, 2012)
A Thousand Kisses (MBC, 2011)
Drama Special "Hair Show" (KBS2, 2011)
Stormy Lovers (MBC, 2010)
Hot Blood (KBS2, 2009)
Worlds Within (KBS2, 2008)
Time Between Dog and Wolf (MBC, 2007)
Coma (OCN, 2005)
You Will Know (KBS2, 2004)

Music video
 Big Bang -  "Lies" (2007)
 Kim Tae-woo -  "Things to Say" (2006)
 Park Hyo-shin -  "Scattered Days" (2005)
 Ha Rim -  "Somewhere Away" (2004)

References

External links
 Cha Soo-yeon Fan Cafe at Daum 
 Cha Soo-yeon at Madin Entertainment 
 
 
 

South Korean film actresses
South Korean television actresses
1981 births
Living people